Pat Malone (born 8 March 1965) is a former Irish sportsperson. He played hurling with his local club Oranmore-Maree and with the Galway senior inter-county team in the 1980s and 1990s.  Malone won back-to-back All-Ireland winners' medals with Galway in 1987 and 1988. Malone also won an All Star in 1993

References

1965 births
Living people
Oranmore-Maree hurlers
Galway inter-county hurlers
Connacht inter-provincial hurlers
All-Ireland Senior Hurling Championship winners